Meshal Al-Mouri is a Saudi Arabian football player.

External links
 Asia.Eurosport.com Profile
 
 
 slstat.com Profile
 

1987 births
Living people
Saudi Arabian footballers
Al Hilal SFC players
Al-Hazem F.C. players
Khaleej FC players
Al-Riyadh SC players
Al-Shoulla FC players
Al-Fayha FC players
Al-Nahda Club (Saudi Arabia) players
Saudi First Division League players
Saudi Professional League players
Association football midfielders